Tycoon (sometimes subtitled Tycoon: A Novel), published in 1997, is the 23rd novel by Harold Robbins.

Starting in the 1930s and ending in the 1970s, it follows the career and love-life of Jack Lear, an entrepreneur who builds an empire in broadcasting. Typically for a Robbins novel, it contains a large amount and variety of sexual content. Kirkus Reviews describes it as a roman à clef, with Lear's career resembling that of William S. Paley.

A review by Reed Business Information inc. concludes:
"Wooden prose notwithstanding, the intricate blend of corporate intrigue and carnal gymnastics makes this a highly seductive read."

References 
Amazon.com

Novels by Harold Robbins
1997 American novels
Roman à clef novels